Kottayam district is a centre of education in Kerala state. The Orthodox Theological Seminary (Orthodox Pazhaya Seminary) at Chungam was the first institution to teach English in South India. It was founded in 1815 by Colonel John Monroe. The C.M.S High School (which later became the Church Missionary Society College High School) was founded by the British missionary, Benjamin Bailey. The first college in Kerala state and the second established under British rule in India was the C.M.S. College (Grammar School) (1840). 
Mahatma Gandhi University is located in Kottayam district.

Educational Institutions
Kottayam district has 478 lower primary schools, 208 upper primary schools and 258 high schools. There are also 24 arts and science colleges, four Training colleges, three co-operative colleges, seven teachers training institutes, two industrial training institutes, and many engineering colleges.  Educational institutions located in Kottayam district include:
 Indian Institute of Information Technology, Kottayam
 Indian Institute of Mass Communication, Kottayam
Mahatma Gandhi University, Kottayam
 Government Medical College, Kottayam, Gandhinagar 
 Government Dental College, Kottayam,(Gandhinagar)
 Rajiv Gandhi Institute of Technology, Kottayam (Government Engineering College), Pampady
 Government College, Kottayam
 C.M.S. College (1817)
 Baselius College
 B.C.M College, Kottayam
 KG College Pampady
 Kuriakose Elias College, Mannanam
 Theophilus College of Nursing, Kangazha (private sector) 
 Mar Thoma Seminary Higher Secondary School, Zion Hill, Kottayam. 
 Kottayam Technical Higher Secondary School and College of Applied Science, IHRD, Puthuppally
 St Joseph College of Communication

Other arts and science colleges
 St. Xavier's College, Vaikom 
 Baker Women's College, Kottayam
 Bishop Kurialacherry College, Amalagiri
 S.N. College, Kumarakom
 St. Mary's College, Manarcad
 Ettumanoorappan College, Ettumanoor
 St. Thomas College, Pala
 Alphonsa College, Pala
Sree Sabareesa College, Mundakayam
St. Dominics College, Kanjirappally
St. George College, Aruvithura
MES College, Erattupetta
 S.B. College, Changanasserry
 NSS College, Changanasserry
 St. Stephen's College, Uzhavoor
 P. G. R. Memorial S N Arts and Science College, Channanikkadu
 Gurudeva Institute of Science and Technology, Puthuppally
 B.K. College, Amalagiri
 S.V.R.N.S.S. College, (Kodungoor) Vazhoor
 PGM College, Devagiri, Kangazha
PRDS College of Arts and Sciences, Changanassery
 Devamatha College, Kuravilangad
 College Of Applied Science, Payyappady, Puthuppally
Shermount College of Arts and Commerce, Erumely
MES College, Erumely
Labour India College, Marangaattupally
Bishop Speechly college, Pallom

Engineering colleges
 Rajiv Gandhi Institute of Technology, Kottayam 
 College of Engineering, Kidangoor
 Indian Institute of Information Technology, Kottayam (2015)

Private sector Engineering colleges
 St. Joseph's College of Engineering & Technology, Pala
 Amal Jyothi College of Engineering, Kanjirappally
 Mangalam College of Engineering
 Saintgits College of Engineering, Pathamuttom
 Kottayam Institute of Technology and Science, Pampady
 College of Engineering, Poonjar
 Mar Augusthinose College, Ramapuram.
 D.B. College, Keezhoor.
 K.G. College, Pampady
 Ettumanoorappan College, Ettumanoor.
 B.V.M. College, Pala
 St. Dominic's College, Kanjirapally
 K.E. College, Mannanam
 Mangalam College of Engineering, Ettumanoor
 Henry Baker College, Melukavu

Institutes of media studies
 Indian Institute of Mass Communication, Kottayam
 KR Narayanan National Institute of Visual Science and Arts
 Manorama School of Communication
 Creative Hut Institute of Photography, Mattakkara

Polytechnic colleges
 Government Polytechnic College, Kottayam
 Model Polytechnic College, Mattakkara
 Government Polytechnic college, Pala

Other organizations
Other institutes include
 Tropical Institute of Ecological Sciences (TIES), a research center affiliated with the Mahatma Gandhi University for Environmental Sciences
 Centre for Rural Management (CRM) 
 Central Research Institute for Homoeopathy
 Sreenivasa Ramanujam Institute of Basic Sciences
 KR Narayanan National Institute of Visual Science and Arts
 Rubber Research Institute of India (RRI).
 NSS Training College, Changanacherry

Schools
 Marian Senior Secondary School, Kalathipady, Kottayam
 Holy Family International School, Elangoi, Chamampathal
 Joseph's Public School and Junior College, Kunnumbhagam, Kanjirappally
 Lourdes Public School and Junior College 
 Sree Kumaramangalam Public School, Kumarakom
 Sree Kumaramangalam Higher Secondary School, Kumarakom
 St. Shantals High School, Mammood, Changanacherry
 Al Manar School, Erattupetta
 St. Joseph's Convent Girls Higher Secondary School, Kottayam
 St. Anne's Girls Higher Secondary School, Kottayam
 Amala Public School, Moothedathukavu, Vaikom
 Government Higher Secondary School, Panamattom
 Baker Memorial Girls High School in Kottayam (1820)
 M.T. Seminary Higher Secondary School, Kottayam
 St. Joseph's High School, Kudakkachira
 Kendriya Vidyalaya, Kottayam Kendriya Vidyalaya, Rubber Board, Kottayam
 Alphonsa Residential School, Bharananganam, Palai
 AKJM School, Kanjirappally, Kottayam
 CMS LP School Arpookara
 Jawahar Navodaya Vidyalaya, Kottayam
 M.D. Seminary School, Kottayam
 N.S.S. College Perunna, Changanacherry
 N.S.S. H.S.S. Anickadu
 Holy Family High School, Parampuzha Baselius College, Kottayam
 Bappuji Central School, Peruva
 Mangalam EMRHSS, Ettumanoor
 Depaul English Medium and Public H.S.S. school, Kuravilangadu
 Emmanuel's HSS, Kothanalloor
 P Geevarghese School of Nursing, Devagiri, Kangazha, Kottayam.
 School of Laboratory Technology MGDM Hospital, Devagiri, Kangazha, Kottayam.
 St. Thomas High School, Marangattupilly
 Labour India Gurukulam Public School
 Labour India College for Teacher Education
 St. George's College Aruvithura
 D.B college, Thalayolaparambu
 St. Mary's H.S. school, Vaikom
 Government Boys H.S., Vaikom
 Government Girls H.S., Vaikom
 Government L.P.S., Mevada
 St. Johns Nephumsians HSS, Kozhuvanal
 St. Antony's High School, Mutholy
 St Joseph's Girls High School, Mutholy
 Holy Cross Higher Secondary School, Cherpunkal
 St. Xavers Upper Primary School, Palayam
 St. Gerge's Lower primary School, Mutholy
 St. Dominic's Higher Secondary School, Kanjirappally
 St. Antony's Public School and Junior College, Anackal, Kanjirappally
 St John's Higher Secondary School, Nedumkunnam
 Government Higher Secondary School, Nedumkunnam
 St. Tersas high school, Nedumkunnam
 St. John's bed college, Nedumkunnam
 St. John's ITC, Nedumkunnam
 St. Vincent E.M.H.S, Pala
 S.F.S Public School and Junior College, Ettumanoor
 MGEMHS, Vakathanam
 St. Antony's High School, Kadpaplamattom
 St. Joseph's Lower Primary School, Koodalloor
 Technical Higher Secondary School, Puthuppally, Kottayam
 St. Joseph Girls High School, Nalukody, Changanacherry
 Government Upper Primary School Nalukody, Changanacherry
 Government High School Paippad, Changanacherry
 St. Ann's Girls High School, Changanacherry,
 Sacred Heart Higher Secondary School, Changanacherry
 Sacred Heart Public School & Junior College, Kilimala, Changanacherry,
 Junior Basic Lower Primary School, Peroor
 St. Sebastian's Upper Primary School, Peroor
 University College of Medical Education, Kottayam 
 Bethany Christian English Medium School, Kangazha
 Government VHSS, Nattakom
 Infant Jesus BCGHSS, Manarcadu
 St. Mary's College, Malam
 St. Mary's Higher Secondary School, Manarcadu
 M G M N S S Higher Secondary School, Lakkattoor
 P. T. Chacko Memorial Government ITI, Pallickathodu
 Amayannoor High School, Amayannoor
 Vivekananda Public School, Thiruvanchoor
 Mount Mary Public School, Malam
 Siva Darsana C B S E School, Mannadi
 C.C.M. Higher Secondary School, Karikkattoor
 St. George's High School and Higher Secondary School, Manimala
 The Baker Vidyapeedh, Kottayam
St Mary's Girls High School Kanjirapally

References